Aberdeen F.C. competed in the Scottish Premier Division, Scottish Cup, League Cup and UEFA Cup in season 1980–81.

Overview

Aberdeen finished second in the Scottish Premier Division. The team played in their first-ever European Champions' Cup campaign, defeating Austrian Champions Austria Memphis, then losing 0–5 on aggregate to English club Liverpool. In the domestic cups, they lost in the quarter final of the League Cup to Dundee and were knocked out of the Scottish Cup in the fourth round by Morton.

Results

Friendlies

Scottish Premier Division

Final standings

Drybrough Cup

Scottish League Cup

Scottish Cup

European Champions' Cup

Squad

Appearances & Goals

|}

References

Aberdeen F.C. seasons
Aberdeen
Aberdeen